Events during the year 2000 in Northern Ireland.

Incumbents
 First Minister - David Trimble
 deputy First Minister - Seamus Mallon
 Secretary of State - Peter Mandelson

Events
6 February - President of Ireland, Mary McAleese attends a concert at Clonard Monastery.
11 February - The British government suspends devolution in Northern Ireland.
25 March - David Trimble retains leadership of the Ulster Unionist Party at its annual general meeting, following a challenge from Martin Smyth.
12 April - The Royal Ulster Constabulary is presented with the George Cross by The Queen.
6 May - The IRA begins decommissioning its weapons.
30 May - Devolution returns to Northern Ireland.
28 July - last 80 prisoners leave the Maze Prison in Northern Ireland as part of the Northern Ireland peace process.
16 September - New extension to the Linen Hall Library is opened.
21 September - William McCrea of the Democratic Unionist Party wins the South Antrim by-election from the Ulster Unionist Party.
11 December - President Clinton of the United States arrives in Dublin for what is his last overseas journey as President.
13 December - Bill Clinton meets with the political leaders of Northern Ireland.

Arts and literature
James Fenton's poetry Thonner an Thon: an Ulster-Scots collection is published.
Michael Longley's poetry collection The Weather in Japan is published and wins the T. S. Eliot Prize.
3 December - Susan Lynch receives an  Irish Film and Television Academy Award for Best Leading Actress in the film Nora.

Sport

Football
Irish League
Winners: Linfield

Irish Cup
Winners: Glentoran 1 - 0 Portadown

Mid-Ulster Ladies F.C. is established playing at Cookstown.

Golf
Senior British Open Championship held at Royal County Down Golf Club (winner:Christy O'Connor Jnr).

Ice Hockey
The Belfast Giants ice hockey team is established and enters the Ice Hockey Superleague playing at the Odyssey Arena.

Births
23 June –  Caitlin Blackwood, actress

Deaths
27 April - Clifford Forsythe, the Ulster Unionist Member of Parliament for South Antrim (born 1929).
2 July - Joey Dunlop, motorcycle racer (born 1952).
9 August - Josias Cunningham, stock broker, farmer and politician (born 1934).
24 October - Brian McConnell, Baron McConnell, Ulster Unionist MP in the Northern Ireland House of Commons and Minister (born 1922).

See also
2000 in England
2000 in Scotland
2000 in Wales

References

 
Northern Ireland